Vianna is a surname. Notable people with the surname include:

Caio Vianna Martins (1923–1938), Brazilian Scout
Herbert Vianna (born 1961), Brazilian singer, songwriter and guitarist
João Vianna (born 1963), Brazilian basketball player
José Vianna da Motta (1868–1948), Portuguese pianist and composer
Klauss Vianna (1928–1992), Brazilian dancer, choreographer and theater director
Lucila Vianna da Silva (born 1976), Brazilian handball player
Oduvaldo Vianna Filho (1936–1974), Brazilian playwright
Tyrteu Rocha Vianna (1898–1963), Brazilian poet
Vitor Vianna, Brazilian mixed martial artist

See also
Viana (disambiguation)
Viana do Castelo Municipality, a Portuguese municipality
Vianna da Motta International Music Competition, a music competition